Phyllonorycter cytisifoliae is a moth of the family Gracillariidae. It is endemic to the Canary Islands and is known from Gran Canaria, La Palma, and Tenerife.

Ecology
The larvae feed on Chamaecytisus palmensis and Chamaecytisus proliferus. They mine the leaves of their host plant. They create a small, upper-surface, tentifom mine. The mine is only a little folded and hardly contacts the leaflet. Pupation takes place inside the mine.

References

cytisifoliae
Moths of Africa
Endemic insects of the Canary Islands
Taxa named by Erich Martin Hering
Moths described in 1927